Angus W. Thomson is an British/American immunologist currently Distinguished Professor of Surgery and Immunology at Starzl Institute, University of Pittsburgh.

Education
He earned his BSc, DSc, and his Ph.D. at The University of Aberdeen, his MSc at The University of Birmingham and a second DSc at Birmingham.

Research
His interests are dendritic cell immunology, cell transplantation, liver research, and immunity. His highest cited paper is "Tolerogenic dendritic cells and the quest for transplant tolerance" at 780 times, according to Google Scholar.

Publications

References

University of Pittsburgh faculty
British immunologists
American immunologists
Year of birth missing (living people)
Living people